Dorji Yangki is one of the first female architects from Bhutan.

She studied architecture at Deakin University in Melbourne, Australia, and later studied in England, Norway, and Japan. From 2008 until 2009 she held the Loeb Fellowship at the Harvard Graduate School of Design. She also completed a Masters in historic buildings at the British University of York.

Dorji is the first elected female President of the Bhutan Association of Architects and the first female Chair of SAARCH  (South Asian Association for Regional Cooperation of Architects). Dorji is currently one of the only actively practicing female Bhutanese Principal Architects leading a private firm in Bhutan

Since graduating in 1996, she was appointed as the first local architect in Bhutan to work on the conservation of heritage sites in Bhutan. As the pioneering Head of the office for Conservation of Heritage Sites at the Ministry for the Home and Cultural Affairs, for over 15 years, Dorji not only helped establish the first office for the conservation of heritage sites, she also drafted the first Bhutan Guidelines for the conservation of heritage sites in Bhutan and initiated the first training workshops in this field. One of her key initiatives was also the incorporation of traditional local architectural concepts and craftsmanship into new architecture and construction in Bhutan.

At the office she worked not only as Principal Architect but also as the project coordinator/Director in numerous projects. Some of the projects include the restoration of the famous monastery [Paro Taktsang] (Tiger's Nest) in Bhutan after the fire of 1998, the establishment of the first Folk Heritage Museum, the renovation of the Thimphu Memorial Chorten, the Dechenphug monastery, the Trongsa Dzong fortress and the Simtokha Dzong fortress among many others.

Some of her key new architectural design works include the design of the National Archives of Bhutan (which was the first climate controlled building in Bhutan), the Office /gallery building of the National Museum, the offices of the Royal Academy of Performing Arts, the Chukha Dzong redesign, the Pangrizampa School of Astrology, the Ugyen Pema Woedling Zangdol Palri temple at Paro, the Smithsonion Folk life Bhutanese temple, and the new Guru Rimpoche Temple at Dechenphug monastery. She also helped curate and design the first exhibitions on Bhutanese culture held outside of Bhutan in the National Museums in Delhi and Kolkata.

Following her passion for sustainable architecture, Dorji was responsible for helping the Ministry of Works and Human Settlements of Bhutan to establish the first Guidelines for the introduction of Green Buildings in Bhutan in 2013. She was also instrumental in leading the drafting of the Bhutanese Architecture Guidelines 2014, for the design of new buildings and cities in the nation. With the Royal University of Bhutan, Dorji was one of the key advisers to help set up the course for the very first degree in Architecture in Bhutan.  

As a native from Bhutan, a country that follows the principle of ‘GNH’ or Gross National Happiness, Dorji advocates for sustainable Biophilic design and planning that has a sense of place, connects people to nature and helps to initiate happiness among people.

References

Bhutanese architects
Deakin University alumni
Women in Bhutan
Year of birth missing (living people)
Harvard Graduate School of Design alumni